Anwar Ali Khokhar is a Pakistani philanthropist and barber who founded Khidmat-i-Masoom Welfare Trust. The trust helps abandoned, missing, homeless children and elderly people.

He was born in 1942 in Qamber Shadadkot, Larkana.

In 2003, he was awarded the Tamgha-i-Imtiaz for his services.

References

Living people
1942 births
Pakistani philanthropists
Barbers
People from Larkana District
Recipients of Tamgha-e-Imtiaz